"She's in Parties" is a song by English gothic rock band Bauhaus. It was released in April 1983 as a single and an extended version appeared on the group's fourth studio album, Burning from the Inside, in 7" and 12" format on the Beggars Banquet label. It was the band's final commercially released single.

It reached No. 26 in the UK Singles Chart.

Legacy 
The song was used in The Ongoing History of New Music 1998 episode "What's the Big Deal About Bauhaus?". The line "She's in parties" is frequently quoted in "What Was Her Name?" by Dave Clarke and Chicks on Speed.

The song was covered by Estonian artist Kerli on her self-titled EP (2007), by English heavy metal band A Forest of Stars as a bonus track on their third album, A Shadowplay for Yesterdays (2012) and by English new wave band In Isolation as a double A-side digital single alongside "TRAPPIST-1" (2017).

The Uruguayan Gothic Rock band RRRRRRR covered the song by recording it in 2010.

Track listings
7"
Side A:
"She's in Parties" - 3:45

Side B:
"Departure" - 4:49

12"
Side A:
"She's in Parties" - 5:49

Side B:
"Here's the Dub" (Special Effects by "Loonatik & Drinks") - 3:18
"Departure" - 4:49

References

External links
 
 AllMusic review

1983 singles
Bauhaus (band) songs
Kerli songs
Songs written by Daniel Ash
1983 songs
Beggars Banquet Records singles